Events from the year 1854 in Russia

Incumbents
 Monarch – Nicholas I

Events

  
 
  
  
 
 
  

 February 27 – Britain sends Russia an ultimatum to withdraw from the Romanian provinces Moldavia and Wallachia.
 March 27 – Crimean War: The United Kingdom declares war on Russia.
 March 28 – France declares war on Russia.
 June 21 – Battle of Bomarsund in Åland. 
 August 16 – Battle of Bomarsund: Russian troops in the island of Bomarsund in Åland surrender to French–British troops.

Births

 July 7 – Nikolai Alexandrovich Morozov, poet, scientist and revolutionary (d. 1946)

Deaths

References

1854 in Russia
Years of the 19th century in the Russian Empire